Solar Wreath is a 1997 sculpture by American artist Larry Kirkland, located on the third floor of the Central Library in Portland, Oregon. Funded by public and private donations funneled through the advocate and support group Friends of the Multnomah County Library, the abstract suspended gilded ring measures 9 feet, 4 inches x 12 feet and is made of aluminum and brass or gold leaf.

According to the Regional Arts & Culture Council, which administers the work, Solar Wreath is part of the artist's "Garden of Knowledge" series, which also includes Garden Stair and Garden Wreath (1997). These three works relate "in form, materials and metaphor", illustrating Kirkland's belief that the library is "a place where people explore, uncover and learn". They were installed before the library building's re-opening in April 1997 after being closed for renovation for more than two years.

Solar Wreath is part of the City of Portland and Multnomah County Public Art Collection courtesy of the Regional Arts & Culture Council.

See also

 1997 in art

References

External links

 Solar Wreath at the Public Art Archive
 Portland Cultural Tours: Public Art Walking Tour (PDF), Regional Arts & Culture Council

1997 establishments in Oregon
1997 sculptures
Abstract sculptures in Oregon
Aluminum sculptures in Oregon
Gold sculptures in Oregon
Southwest Portland, Oregon